Zu/Dälek is a self-titled split album by Italian band Zu and the American experimental hip hop duo Dälek, released in 2005.

Track listing
 Dälek Vs Zu - Igneo Deadverse Remix
 Zu Vs Dälek - Spiritual Healing Remix

References

2005 albums
Zu (band) albums
Dälek albums
Split albums